The 1986 Australian Short Course Swimming Championships were held at the Mowbray Pool in Launceston, Tasmania from Friday 5 September to Sunday 7 September. They were organised by Australian Swimming.

Medal winners

Men's events

Legend:

Women's events

Legend:

References

 

Swim 
Australian Short Course Swimming Championships
Australian Short Course Swimming Championships, 1986
Short Course Swimming Championships
Sport in Launceston, Tasmania